John "Jack" Anwin (5 June 1867 in Collingwood, Victoria – 13 August 1956 in Caulfield, Victoria) was an Australian jockey who was best known for riding Bravo to victory in the 1889 Melbourne Cup. Jack and his two brothers, Sam and George, were notable for taking the first three places in two races on 18 July 1903 in Boulder, Western Australia. He is buried in Springvale, Victoria.

References
 

1867 births
1956 deaths
Jockeys from Melbourne
Sportsmen from Victoria (Australia)
People from Collingwood, Victoria
Burials in Victoria (Australia)